The 2012 Connacht Senior Football Championship was that year's installment of the annual Connacht Senior Football Championship held under the auspices of the Connacht GAA. It was won by Mayo who defeated Sligo in the final. This was Mayo's 43rd Connacht senior title. Mayo were drawn at home with London or Leitrim in their semi-final, while Sligo's route was the harder—playing away to New York and overcoming Galway in their semi-final, only to fall at the final hurdle once again. The winning Mayo team received the J. J. Nestor Cup, and automatically advanced to the quarter-final stage of the 2012 All-Ireland Senior Football Championship. Sligo entered the All-Ireland Qualifiers but soon exited, with a tame 0-13 - 0-04 defeat by Kildare in their next game. Donegal defeated Connacht champions Mayo in the 2012 All-Ireland Senior Football Championship Final.

Bracket

Quarter-finals

Semi-finals

Final

References

External links
Connacht GAA website

2C
Connacht Senior Football Championship